Albert Cluytens (born 16 November 1955) is a Belgian footballer. He played in eleven matches for the Belgium national football team from 1977 to 1981.

References

External links
 

1955 births
Living people
Belgian footballers
Belgium international footballers
Association football midfielders
Footballers from Antwerp
K.S.K. Beveren players
R.S.C. Anderlecht players
Royal Antwerp F.C. players
K.V. Mechelen players
R.W.D. Molenbeek players
K.F.C. Eendracht Zele players